The Misa Sine Nomine (Mass Without Name) is a 1977 musical work for narrator, mixed choirs with up to 36 voices, organ, and percussion by Leon Schidlowsky. It was composed in memory of Chilean folk singer and human rights activist Víctor Jara. The work is a setting of parts of the mass ordinary juxtaposed with Biblical passages in Hebrew, and texts in other languages by various contemporary authors, including by the composer himself. The composition is in eleven movements and utilizes different groupings of performers in each. The score uses graphic notation. The movements, which can be performed separately, are meant to be accompanied by visual projections. It was first performed in Hamburg in 1980.

History 
Leon Schidlowsky composed Misa Sine Nomine in 1977 in memory of Víctor Jara. Jara was a Chilean folk singer who was one of the leaders of the "Nueva canción chilena" movement, as well as a poet, and human rights activist; he was arrested on 12 September 1973, the day after the coup d'état against Salvador Allende. He was held at the Estadio Chile, where he was tortured and murdered by the Chilean military.

For texts, Schidlowsky juxtaposed parts of the mass ordinary (Kyrie, Gloria, Credo, Benedictus and Dona nobis pacem) with texts by George Grosz, himself, and Vladimir Mayakovsky, beginning and ending with texts from the Bible in Hebrew. The score uses graphic notation. The movements can be performed separately, and are meant to be accompanied by visual projections.

The first performance was given in 1980 while the composer spent a sabbatical year in Hamburg, played at the Musikhochschule Hamburg by the Bramfelder Kantorei conducted by Klaus Vetter. The work was published by the Israel Music Institute.

Structure 
Misa Sine Nomine is in eleven movements for different scoring: a speaker, mixed choirs with up to 36 voices, organ and percussion, including gongs and suspended cymbals:
 Bereschít bará elohím et haschamáim weét haáretz, text from the Bible, for two mixed choruses and percussion
 Kyrie, for large mixed chorus
 Lied, text by George Grosz, for speaker and organ
 Gloria, for large mixed chorus and four gongs (1 player)
 Chile, text by the composer, for 20 mixed voices
 Credo, for speaker, large mixed chorus, organ and four bass drums (1 player)
 Benedictus, for 36 mixed voices and four suspended cymbals (1 player)
 Ich komme, text by Vladimir Mayakovsky, for 36 mixed voices
 Dona nobis pacem, for large mixed chorus
 Babel, text from the Bible, for 6 sopranos, 6 altos, 4 tenors, 4 basses
 Epilog, text from the Bible, for speaker, small mixed chorus, large mixed chorus, organ, 4 percussion

The duration is given as 45 minutes.

The first movement is a setting of the beginning of the Hebrew Bible.

Recording 
It was released in 2002. For a focus on the juxtaposition of mass liturgy and other texts, several tracks combine two movements.

Notes

References

Further reading 
 Traber, Habakuk: Schidlowsky, Leon: misa sine nomine. In: Forum Kirchenmusik, Templin, Germany 1999.
 Kube, Michael: Schidlowsky, Leon: misa sine nomine. In: Neue Zeitschrift für Musik, Mainz 1999.

External links 
 
 Sines / Misa sine nomine: Part 3: Chile (1976) Leon Schidlowsky pinterest.es

1977 compositions
Schidlowsky